Najaf Qoli (also Romanized as Najaf Qolī; also known as Najaf Golī and Najafī) is a village in Doab Rural District, in the Central District of Selseleh County, Lorestan Province, Iran. At the 2006 census, its population was 67, in 13 families.

References 

Towns and villages in Selseleh County